Shahiar may refer to:

Shahyar Ghanbari (b. 1950), Iranian musician